Lluís Cortés (born 10 August 1986) is a Spanish football coach who is the current head coach of the Ukraine women's national team. He was formerly manager of Primera División club FC Barcelona Femení. His treble-winning 2020/21 season with FC Barcelona Femení is widely regarded as one of the greatest season's in women's club football history.

Before becoming a coach, he played briefly for UE Lleida in the Spanish Segunda División in 2004-05.

Coaching career
Cortés has extensive experience in the women's game, having managed Catalan U12, U16, and U18 teams, and the senior side from 2014 to 2018.

Cortés joined Barcelona as an analyst in the summer of 2017, and until 2019 he was part of the assistant coaching team.

On 8 January 2019, he replaced Fran Sánchez as new head coach. With Cortés as manager, the club reached its first Women's Champions League final in 2019, but failed to win it, losing to Lyon. A year later in 2020, Barcelona won the Spanish Primera División and Supercopa de España. Barcelona completed the 2019-20 Spanish domestic double after winning 2019-20 Copa de la Reina in February 2021.

Barcelona successfully defended the Primera División title after winning their first 26 games. He led Barcelona to the Women's Champions League final in 2021, two years after their defeat against Lyon. Barcelona emerged victorious, defeating Chelsea 4–0 to win their first Women's Champions League title. In May 2021, Barcelona Femení completed their first treble after winning 2020-21 Copa de la Reina against Levante at the Estadio Municipal de Butarque. Despite winning the historic treble, reports emerged that several Barcelona Femení players had requested his sacking, and he decided to resign from his role as Barcelona Femení’s head coach after two years in charge.

On November 14, the president of the Ukrainian Football Association Andriy Pavelko announced the appointment of Cortés as the head coach of the Ukraine national women's team.

Managerial Statistics

Honours

Manager

FC Barcelona Femení
UEFA Women's Champions League: 2020–21 Runners-up: 2018–19
Primera División: 2019–20, 2020–21
Copa de la Reina: 2020, 2021
Supercopa de España: 2020
Copa Catalunya Femenina: 2019

Individual 
UEFA Women's Coach of the Year: 2020–21
 IFFHS Women's World's Best Club Coach: 2021

References

External links
 
 
 
 

1986 births
Living people
Sportspeople from Lleida
Association football midfielders
Spanish footballers
Spanish football managers
FC Barcelona Femení managers
Segunda División players
UE Lleida players
Ukraine women's national football team managers
Spanish expatriate football managers
Expatriate football managers in Ukraine
Spanish expatriate sportspeople in Ukraine
Primera División (women) managers